Vincenzo Baviera (born 28 July 1945) is a Swiss sculptor. He was born in Zürich, Switzerland.

Biography
In 1964–69, he studied architecture at ETH Zurich. In 1974, he graduated social psychology and ethnology at the University of Zürich. He became the professor of sculpture at the Hochschule für Gestaltung in Offenbach am Main in 1984. In 1988, he was awarded with the Kainz Medal. He was the lecturer of the ETH Zürich from 1991 to 1996. In 1997, he won artist in residence at the Guernsey College for Further Education.

Exhibitions
 1985 Kunstmuseum Winterthur, Switzerland
 1996 Kunsthalle Recklinghausen, Germany
 1997 Kunsthalle Winterthur, Switzerland
 1998 Museum Wiesbaden, Germany
 2010 Streetarts Festival, Stühlingen, Germany

Gallery

References

Bibliography
 

Swiss sculptors
1945 births
Artists from Zürich
ETH Zurich alumni
University of Zurich alumni
Living people